Jean-Aimé Randrianalijaona (born 26 June 1946) is a Malagasy hurdler. He competed in the men's 400 metres hurdles at the 1972 Summer Olympics.

References

1946 births
Living people
Athletes (track and field) at the 1972 Summer Olympics
Malagasy male hurdlers
Olympic athletes of Madagascar
Place of birth missing (living people)